The Real Housewives of Amsterdam (abbreviated RHOAMS) is a Dutch reality television series that debuted on Videoland on November 24, 2022. Developed as the eighteenth international installment of The Real Housewives franchise, it documents the personal and professional lives of several women residing in Amsterdam, the Netherlands.

Overview and casting

The series premiered on November 24, 2022 and starred Sheila Bergeik, Hella Huizinga, Susanna Klibansky, Djamila Celina, Kimmylien Nguyen, Cherry-Ann Person and Maria Tailor. 

Magali Gorré, previously a full time cast member on The Real Housewives of Cheshire, appears in a recurring guest role.

Timeline of cast members

Episodes

References

Amsterdam
Dutch reality television series
Women in the Netherlands